Injectable birth control is a form of hormonal contraception and may refer to:

 Progestogen-only injectable birth control
 Combined injectable birth control

Estrogen-only injectable birth control, for instance estradiol undecylate, has also been studied, but has not been marketed.

References

Hormonal contraception
Injection (medicine)